Braidley is a hamlet in Coverdale in the Yorkshire Dales, England.  It lies in the civil parish of Carlton Highdale in the Richmondshire district of North Yorkshire. The River Cover flows nearby, and the peak of Little Whernside is visible from the hamlet.

References

Villages in North Yorkshire
Coverdale (dale)